Daniel Schöpf (born 9 January 1990) is an Austrian footballer who last played for SSV Jahn Regensburg.

Career

Club career
Schöpf began his youth career with Austria Wien, and having advanced through the club's youth system made his debut for the second team as a substitute in a 2–1 win against FC Lustenau in Regional League East on 1 August 2008. He subsequently joined FC Lustenau in 2010, and he left to join Altach a year later. He spent two years in the First League with Altach before joining Wiener Neustadt in the summer of 2013. In summer 2015, he transferred to SSV Jahn Regensburg. His contract with Regensburg ended in 2017.

Schöpf has represented Austria at both under-19 and under-21 level.

Ahead of the 2018–19 season, Schöpf joined Floridsdorfer AC. He left the club at the end of the season. In summer 2020, Schöpf moved to SC Wolkersdorf.

References

External links
Daniel Schöpf at ÖFB

1990 births
Living people
Association football midfielders
Austrian footballers
Austrian expatriate footballers
Austria under-21 international footballers
Austrian Football Bundesliga players
2. Liga (Austria) players
3. Liga players
FC Lustenau players
SC Rheindorf Altach players
SC Wiener Neustadt players
SSV Jahn Regensburg players
Floridsdorfer AC players
Regionalliga players
Footballers from Vienna
Austrian expatriate sportspeople in Germany
Expatriate footballers in Germany